Emmerich Manual High School is a public high school in Indianapolis, Indiana, USA. It was a traditional high school in the Indianapolis Public Schools district. It is now one of the schools operated by Christel House Academy.

History

Establishment
To provide training in such fields as mechanics, drafting, and the domestic arts, a resolution was adopted which petitioned the Indiana General Assembly to permit the school board to levy a tax for the construction of a new industrial school in Indianapolis. On June 14, 1888, the board went on record as favoring the proposed step in manual training education and voted to establish two such classes in the Indianapolis High School. Forty students enrolled in these first classes, and enthusiasm for the undertaking grew. A bill to enable the Board of School Commissioners to levy a tax for the construction of an industrial school in Indianapolis (House Bill 811) was introduced in the Indiana House of Representatives on February 19, 1891. With the support of the Marion County legislators the bill passed the House easily: however, it did not reach the Senate floor until the closing days of the General Assembly, On the next to last day of the legislature, Senator Thompson of Marion County was persuaded to sponsor the bill. Because his name would not be reached in sufficient time to present the bill, Senator Fuik of Monroe and Brown counties at the last minute presented the bill to the Senate. This bill, permitting the collection of five cents on every hundred dollars of taxable property in Indianapolis for the establishment of an industrial training school, was passed with one dissenting vote, on March 7, 1891.

Although several sites were considered, the south side was favored because there was no high school already in that area.

Dedication ceremonies for the Industrial Training School at 525 South Meridian Street in Indianapolis took place on May 31, 1895.

Renaming
In 1899, the school was renamed Manual Training School. In 1916, it was renamed Charles E. Emmerich Manual Training High School, in honor of the first principal of the Industrial Training High School.

South Building extension
On June 7, 1920, the cornerstone of the "South Building" extension was laid. This would include an auditorium, cafeteria and new gymnasium. A portion of this wing collapsed while under construction in November 1920. The addition opened in the Spring of 1922.

Relocation
In 1953, the Charles E. Emmerich Manual Training High School relocated to 2405 Madison Avenue, its present location. The Meridian Street facility was renamed the Harry E. Wood Vocational Training School, which operated until 1978. The South Building was razed in 1986.

Curriculum
The student-teacher ratio is 14:1, below the state average of 17:1.

Performance
In 2018–19, the school's average scores in standardized English/Language Arts and Math tests were below the Indiana state average scores. The four-year graduation rate was 51%.

Notable alumni
Joe Rand Beckett (1910) – attorney and member of the Indiana Senate representing Johnson County and Marion County in 1929, 1931, and the special session in 1932
Simon Baus – impressionist artist, member of the Irvington Group of artists
 Maria Cantwell - U.S. Senator
Jay Hall Connaway - artist
Glen Harmeson (1926) – former head football coach at Lehigh University (1934–1941), Wabash College (1946–1950), and Arkansas State University (1954); also head basketball coach at Lehigh (1934–1937) and Wabash (1950–1951)
Maria Cantwell (1977) – United States Senator from Washington, serving since 2001
Hooks Dauss (1907) – Major League Baseball pitcher
Elizabeth Miller (1878-1961) – novelist
Dick Nyers – player for the NFL's Baltimore Colts and football coach of University of Indianapolis
Lutah Maria Riggs (1914) – architect and first woman in California to be named a Fellow of the American Institute of Architects
William Edouard Scott (1903) – artist
Walter Bedell Smith – senior officer of the United States Army who served as General (United States) Dwight D. Eisenhower's chief-of-staff at Allied Forces Headquarters (AFHQ) during the Tunisia Campaign and the Allied invasion of Italy in 1943 during World War II; later named as an Ambassador to Moscow, Director of the CIA, and Under Secretary of State
Dick Van Arsdale (1961) – former head coach of the NBA's Phoenix Suns; player for the New York Knicks and Phoenix Suns; identical twin brother of Tom Van Arsdale
Tom Van Arsdale (1961) – former NBA player for the Detroit Pistons, Cincinnati Royals / Kansas City-Omaha Kings, Philadelphia 76ers, Atlanta Hawks, and Phoenix Suns; identical twin brother of Dick Van Arsdale

See also
List of high schools in Indiana
Native American mascot controversy
Sports teams named Redskins

References

External links
 
 Indianapolis Public Schools

Educational institutions established in 1895
Public high schools in Indiana
Schools in Indianapolis
1895 establishments in Indiana
Charter schools in Indiana